Juda is an unincorporated census-designated place located in the town of Jefferson, in Green County, Wisconsin, United States. Juda is 5 miles east of Monroe along Wisconsin State Highway 11, and 81. As of the 2010 census, its population was 357. Juda is a part of the Madison Metropolitan Statistical Area.

On March 30, 1967, nine students from Juda's Union High School, all girls, were killed when a Delta Air Lines DC-8 jet crashed into the motel where they had been staying during a senior class trip to New Orleans, Louisiana.

Notable people
 Charle Newman, baseball player
 Gabriel Zophy, Wisconsin politician

Education
 The Juda School District is located in Juda.

References

Census-designated places in Wisconsin
Census-designated places in Green County, Wisconsin